Scythris tributella is a moth of the family Scythrididae. It was described by Zeller in 1847. It is found in central and southern Europe, North Africa (Libya) and Russia (southern Urals), Georgia, Turkey and Turkmenistan.

The wingspan is 9–12 mm. The fore- and hindwings are chocolate brown without markings. The wings are slightly shiny at the base, the head and abdomen black, and the hindwings lighter than the forewings.

The larvae feed on Coronilla varia.

References

tributella
Moths described in 1847